Zero Hour is Zero Hour's first album. Released in 1999, it was limited to 2100 copies.

Track listing
 Eyes of Denial  – 4:42
 The System Remains  – 7:22
 Voice of Reason  – 8:40
 I. Descent  – 3:45
 II. Awaken  – 4:33
 III. Union  – 5:44
 IV. Solace  – 1:03
 V. Ascent  – 2:01

Credits
 Erik Rosvold – vocals
 Jasun Tipton – guitars
 Troy Tipton – Bass
 Mike Guy – drums
 Matt Guillory – keyboards
 Phillip Bennett – keyboards
 Brittany Tipton – Female vocals

1999 debut albums
Zero Hour (band) albums